HD 196885 is a binary star system in the northern constellation of Delphinus. It comprise a  pair of stars HD 196885 A and HD 196885 B on a 69-years eccentric orbit.

The primary star is near the lower limit of visibility to the naked eye with an apparent visual magnitude of 6.39. It is located at a distance of 110.9 light years from the Sun. It is drifting closer with a radial velocity of −30 km/s, and is expected to come to within  in 836,000 years.

The secondary, component B, is a red dwarf star separated by 0.6 arcseconds from the primary star that was discovered in 2006 with NaCo at VLT. It has a class in the range M1V to M3V with 51% of the Sun's mass.

The star BD+10 4351B, located 192 arcseconds away from HD 196885 is located at the same distance and may be a physically bound companion star, in which case HD 196885 is a triple system. If it is bound, then the separation is at least 6,600 AU (the separation along the line-of-sight is unknown, so this value represents a lower limit on the true separation).

Planetary system

In 2004, a planet was announced to be orbiting the star HD 196885 A in a 386-day orbit. Perturbation by the secondary star in this system may have driven the planet into a high inclination orbit. The planetary existence was confirmed and parameters were refined by 2022.

See also
 Epsilon Reticuli
 GJ 3021

References

F-type main-sequence stars
M-type main-sequence stars
Planetary systems with one confirmed planet
Binary stars
Delphinus (constellation)
BD+10 4351
196885
101966
7907
J20395188+1114588